Deal or No Deal is the name of several closely related television game shows, the first of which (launching the format) was the Dutch Miljoenenjacht (Hunt/Chase for Millions). The centerpiece of this format is the final round (a.k.a. the "case game" or "main game" ) which is played with up to 26 cases (or, in some versions, boxes), each containing randomly assigned sums of money. After the player for the case game is determined, this contender claims (or is assigned) one case or a box at the start of the game, without its contents being revealed. The contestant then chooses the other cases or boxes, one at a time, to be immediately opened and removed from play. Throughout the game, the player is offered an amount of money or prizes to quit, being asked the titular question, "Deal or no deal?" If the contestant rejects every deal and eliminates all the other cases or boxes, the player keeps the money that was in the original case or box. Thus, the contestant "wins" depending on whether the player should have taken one of the deals or should have held onto the original case or box until the very end.

Gameplay

The gameplay of the show differs from country to country. In some countries, there is a preliminary contest in which the studio audience is whittled down to one final contender by several trivia question rounds, this final contender then proceeds to the main game. This was the format used by the Dutch show "Miljoenenjacht" (Hunt/Chase for Millions) which initiated the "Deal or no Deal" game (originally the Dutch show was based on a German format called "Die Chance deines Lebens" (The Chance of your Lifetime) which was based on trivia questions and did not have the briefcase element at all). There are also some versions with the number of players equal to the number of cases, each player receives one case. Via a short trivia round or a random selection, one player is selected to be the contestant for the main game with his case. In other countries, there is only one preselected contestant who will play the main game without any preliminary contest.

The main game revolves around the opening of a set of numbered briefcases, each of which contains a different prize (cash or otherwise).  The contents (i.e., the values) of all of the cases are known at the start of the game, but the specific location of any prize is unknown.  The contestant claims (or is assigned) a case to begin the game. The case's value is not revealed until the conclusion of the game.

The contestant then begins choosing cases that are to be removed from play. The amount inside each chosen case is immediately revealed; by process of elimination, the amount revealed cannot be inside the case the contestant initially claimed (or was assigned). Throughout the game, after a predecided number of cases have been opened, the "Banker" offers the contestant an amount of money and/or prizes to quit the game; the offer is based roughly on the amounts remaining in play and the contestant's demeanor, so the bank tries to 'buy' the contestant's case for a lower price than what's inside the case. The player then answers the titular question, choosing:

 "Deal", accepting the offer presented and ending the game, or
 "No Deal", rejecting the offer and continuing the game.

This process of removing cases and receiving offers continues, until either the player accepts an offer to 'deal', or all offers have been rejected and the values of all unchosen cases are revealed. Should a player end the game by taking a deal, a pseudo-game is continued from that point to see how much the player could have won by remaining in the game. Depending on subsequent choices and offers, it is determined whether or not the contestant made a "good deal", i.e. won more than if the game were allowed to continue.

Since the range of possible values is known at the start of each game, how much the banker offers at any given point changes based on what values have been eliminated (i.e. the offer increases if lower values are eliminated and decreases if upper values are eliminated).  To promote suspense and lengthen games, the banker's offer is usually less than the expected value dictated by probability theory, particularly early in the game. Generally, the offers early in the game are very low relative to the values still in play, but near the end of the game approach (or even exceed) the average of the remaining values.

Only a few people have ever won the top prize on any version of the show (see table below). For a contestant to win the top prize the player would have to select the case containing the top prize and reject every offer the banker makes during the game. The chances of a player selecting the top prize are 4–5% depending on how many amounts are in the game.

International versions

Legend:
 Currently airing 
 Awaiting confirmation 
 Status unknown 
 Upcoming season 
 No longer airing 

The first German version, "Die Chance deines Lebens" hosted by Kai Pflaume did not have the case game as the final round (they played a trivia game instead). However this was the show the original "Deal or No Deal" version (the Dutch "Miljoenenjacht" hosted by Linda de Mol) was actually based on. Miljoenenjacht started in November 2000 and introduced the case game in December 2002 after a 15-month hiatus of the show.

Véronique Landry is the only model to appear on more than one version of the show, on both the French and English Canadian versions.  Howie Mandel, Héctor Sandarti, and Linda de Mol each have hosted multiple versions of the show: Mandel, with the American English and Canadian English versions, Sandarti with both the American Spanish and Mexican Spanish versions, and de Mol with both the Netherlands Dutch and German (in 2004) versions of the show. In the UK version Deal Or No Deal helped relaunch Noel Edmonds' career.

Top prize winners

All amounts below the prizes are their equivalents in United States dollars at the time of their win.

At the other end of the spectrum, in the UK edition broadcast on December 7, 2009, a contestant named Corinne opened her box to reveal (and thus win) 1p, having turned down first an offer of £88,000 and then an offer to swap boxes, which would have given her the top £250,000 prize. A similar event occurred on the U.S. version on August 25, 2008, where contestant Koshka Blackburn won $5,000 which was in her case after turning down the banker's offer of $530,000 and then the option to switch cases, which would've made her the first $1,000,000 winner. Also in the U.S. on September 22, 2006, Michelle Falco kept in $750,000 and $1,000,000 in play all the way to the end, she turned down the biggest offer of $880,000 and refused to switch her case, in her case was $750,000. She also would have been the first $1,000,000 winner had she switched cases. And again, in the U.S. on October 22, 2008, contestant Richie Bell won $1 which was in his case after rejecting the final offer of $416,000 and the option to switch cases, which would've made him the second $1,000,000 winner. Richie also won an additional $10,000 after completing the "Banker's Challenge" minigame, thus making his total winnings $10,001. Had he had switched, he would have won $1,010,000. Many other contestants around the world would have won the top prize if they had swapped their box/case.

Basis and antecedents

The game show has attracted attention from mathematicians, statisticians, and economists as a natural decision-making experiment. In 2008 a team of economists analyzed the decisions of people appearing in Dutch, German and U.S. episodes and found, among other things, that contestants are less risk-averse or even risk-seeking when they saw their expected winnings drop. They went so far as to say that the show, "almost appears to be an economics experiment rather than a TV show." They found that contestants behave similarly in different versions of the show, despite large differences in the amounts at stake; amounts appear to be evaluated in relative terms, for example in proportion to the initial average, and not in terms of their absolute monetary value. The research received a great deal of media attention, appearing on the front page of The Wall Street Journal and being featured on National Public Radio. This work was built upon by de Roos and Sarafidis, who analysed the Australian version of the show and determined that the risk-taking behaviour of a number of contestants would be inconsistent within each game (i.e. their aversion to risk would change), depending on the state of play and relative risk aversion of their confidant on the show.

Australian Deal or No Deal contestants are selected "on the basis of being 'outgoing', but there is no screening of contestants on the basis of their risk preferences". It is thought that other versions may screen contestants for being amicable to risk-taking behaviour.

Despite its air of originality and huge international success—there are more than 60 versions worldwide—there have been, in fact, numerous antecedents to the current run of shows. The first was the It's in the Bag, a New Zealand radio game show invented by Selwyn Toogood which began in the 1950s and which ran for decades after it was later adapted for television (1970s–90s). The show popularized the catch-phrases, "By hokey," and "What will it be, customers—the money or the bag?" in New Zealand. Similarly, in the 1950s, the UK TV show Take Your Pick offered contestants the choice of taking a money offer or risking opening a box. Later, in the 1980s, The Bong Game, a radio call-in show created by UK's Capital FM, tested contestants by offering them increasing returns in tandem with increasing risk.

Another long-running game show, Let's Make a Deal, involved contestants deciding whether or not to take offers based on what may or may not be behind a curtain/door or inside a box. Let's Make a Deal ran in the U.S. for nearly three decades from 1963 to 1991, during which time Monty Hall was the program's "Big Dealer," and was revived in 2009 with Wayne Brady as the Big Dealer. Also in the U.S., in the 1970s and 1980s, was a game show called Treasure Hunt, hosted by Geoff Edwards and produced by Chuck Barris's company, which featured a similar concept to Deal or No Deal. The show featured contestants selecting a treasure chest or box with surprises inside in the hope of winning large prizes or a cash jackpot. Both game shows, however, also featured worthless or nearly-worthless joke prizes, which Let's Make a Deal called "zonks" and which Treasure Hunt called "klunks." Deal or No Deal does not feature such joke prizes in the US version but does in many international versions. Finally, from 1997 to 2003, Win Ben Stein's Money pitted contestants against an in-house adversary.

Algorithm used by "The Bank" 
There are several theories concerning the algorithm that "The Bank" uses to determine the appropriate bank offer. This is a secret held by the various publishers around the world, however a number of people have approximated the algorithm with various levels of accuracy. In many variations of the format the Bank does not know the contents of the briefcase, and therefore the Monty Hall Problem does not apply to the probability calculations, but this varies from country to country.

Statistical studies of the US version of the show were undertaken by Daniel Shifflet in 2011, and showed a linear regression of bank offers against expected value. In summary, Shifflet found that in the syndicated 30-minute version of the show the bank would offer a percentage of the expected value (EV) of the remaining cases, and this percentage increased linearly from approximately 37% of EV at the first offer to approximately 84% of EV at the seventh offer. This version of the program also allowed players to ‘hypothetically’ play out the remainder of the game from the point where they accepted the bank's offer, and Shiffler noted that the hypothetical bank offers were significantly higher than real bank offers at equivalent points in the game.

Video games
 Innovative Concepts in Entertainment developed an arcade redemption adaptation of the show, where instead of prize money, players could win tickets.
 The U.K. version of Deal or No Deal was converted into a mobile game by Gameloft and featured the same rules and format as the TV show. The game was so well-received that versions of it were developed for other countries as well. Its international success landed it on the top-sellers list.
Almost all major formats of the game were converted into games for various gaming consoles, the PC, Macromedia Flash, and even a dedicated electronic handheld game.
Various online gambling and gaming sites have adapted the Deal or No Deal concept for their games.

Online gambling
The Deal or No Deal television game show, based on the original Dutch Miljoenenjacht (Hunt for Millions), was introduced to the world by Endemol. The popular format, which requires the contestant to choose from 26 boxes or cases to reveal cash values, grew in popularity and eventually made its way into the online gambling industry as a result of the 2009 partnership between Playtech's Virtue Fusion and Endemol Games.  
 
Online Bingo licensees of Virtue Fusion, previously acquired by Playtech, introduced DOND themed 75-ball and 90-ball rooms in addition to a slot game based on the game show, scratch cards and the launch of a new bingo brand named after the game show, Deal or No Deal Bingo.
 
Online gamblers experience the show's concept when securing a Full House win in the themed bingo rooms. The winner or winners enter a round of negotiations with the banker where they must make the ultimate decision, Deal or No Deal. The sense of community, often embraced by bingo players, is called upon as they assist the winner in determining the best option by commenting in the room's chat section. The Community Jackpot is divided among the Full House winner (50%) and all game participants (50%).
 
In February 2016, Playtech announced the renewal of its licensing agreement with Endemol UK, which will see the availability of DOND licensed online products continue for an additional three years. Under this contract, Playtech is granted exclusive rights to deliver these themed games to the UK market.
 
The range of DOND games are available at Virtue Fusion powered bingo brands such as bet365, Gala Bingo, Ladbrokes, Mecca Bingo and William Hill.

See also
Game Theory Analysis of Deal Or No Deal
List of television show franchises

References

External links

 
Banijay franchises
Television franchises